The Baltic Cable is a monopolar HVDC power line running beneath the Baltic Sea that interconnects the electric power grids of Germany and Sweden. Its maximum transmission power is 600 megawatts (MW).

The Baltic Cable uses a transmission voltage of 450 kV – the highest operating voltage for energy transmission in Germany. The total project cost was 2 billion SEK (US$280 million), and the link was put into operation in December 1994.

Route 

After crossing the Priwall Peninsula the cable runs parallel to the coast of Mecklenburg-Vorpommern, before turning north-easterly toward Sweden. At sea, it crosses the submarine cable of HVDC Kontek. This is the only crossing of two submarine HVDC cables in the Baltic Sea and one of the only few worldwide.

From the landing point at the southern coast of Sweden, the powerline transitions to an overhead line a few kilometres inland. It runs to a termination tower in Kruseberg which is attached to a 400 kV/130 kV substation of the Swedish power grid.

The anode, which is situated in the Baltic Sea, consists of 40 titanium nets each with a surface of 20 m2, which are laid on the sea bottom under plastic tubes and stones. It is connected to Kruseberg converter station with a 23-kilometre-long underground and submarine power line, which consists of two parallel-connected cables with 630 mm2 cross section.

The cathode is situated in the Baltic Sea north of Elmenhorst. It consists of a bare copper ring with a 2-kilometre diameter. It is connected to the static inverter plant in Lübeck-Herrenwyk with a 32-kilometre-long cable. The first 20 kilometres of this cable have a cross section of 1400 mm2 and the last of 800 mm2. This cable is laid in the tunnel under Trave River at a distance of 2.5 metres from the high voltage cable. The separation reduces the magnetic field, which may affect compasses of vessels in this highly frequented area. As the cable is a monopolar line, it produces much higher magnetic fields than bipolar cables with the same ratings.

Operation 
Because this overhead line can generate radio interference, there is a highly effective active filter system installed at the Kruseberg converter station. In the Lübeck-Herrenwyk converter station, there is no requirement for such a system, because there is no overhead powerline section on the German side.

The cable cannot be operated at the maximum transmission rating of 600 megawatts, because the 380 kV line which begins at the converter station of Lübeck-Herrenwyk ends at the Lübeck-Siems substation. This is the only 380 kV powerline in Germany which has no direct connection to the Central European 380 kV grid, which caused the Baltic Cable to have a 372 megawatt (MW) capacity instead of 600 MW. This bottleneck was solved in 2004 when an additional 220 kV line was built. However power flows on 220 kV and 110 kV lines face increased losses of the transmission.

In the area of the converter station there is also a 110 kV/220 kV sub-station, fed by two 110 kV circuits from the Lübeck-Siems sub-station. There is no transformer for coupling the 380 kV- and the 110 kV-grid in the area of the Lübeck-Herrenwyk converter station.

In 2016, the owner Statkraft started a court case against Swedish authorities in disagreements over profits from electricity trade in the cable.

In the night from April 16, 2017 to April 17, 2017 on the electrode cable on Priwall peninsula a fault occurred, which resulted in the generation of hydrogen at the fault location as it acted as cathode. The hydrogen got ignited by the generated heat and a 3 metres high flame shot off the ground. As there is no device monitoring the state of the electrode cable, no alert was made to the operators. Fire brigades were first not able to extinguish the fire, but the flame went out when the current was switched off.

Expansion schemes 
Of the two originally planned 380 kV lines to Lübeck (from Krümmel Nuclear Power Plant to Lübeck-Siems and from Schwerin substation to Lübeck-Herrenwyk), the 380 kV line between Krümmel and Lübeck-Siems was canceled according to speakers from E.ON AG.

There is still the option to build a 380 kV line from Lübeck to another 380 kV substation in Schleswig-Holstein, Hamburg or Lower Saxony. The construction of the 380 kV link between Lübeck-Herrenwyk and Schwerin is not progressing due to opposition from ecologists.

A transmission rating of 600 MW should be possible via a new 220 kV cable and a static var compensator in Lübeck-Siems after 2005.

See also 

 Electricity sector in Sweden
 Konti-Skan, cable between Denmark and Sweden
 Estlink, cable between Estonia and Finland
 Fenno-Skan, cable between Finland and Sweden
 LitPol Link, cable between Lithuania and Poland
 SwePol, cable between Poland and Sweden
 NordBalt, a cable between Sweden and Lithuania

References

External links 

 Baltic Cable AB website
 ABB: Baltic Cable - An HVDC cable links Sweden with Germany
 https://web.archive.org/web/20051115122606/http://www.transmission.bpa.gov/cigresc14/Compendium/BALTIC.htm
 https://web.archive.org/web/20051115122606/http://www.transmission.bpa.gov/cigresc14/Compendium/Baltic%20Pictures.pdf

Electrical interconnectors to and from the Nordic grid
Electrical interconnectors to and from the Synchronous Grid of Continental Europe
Energy infrastructure completed in 1994
Submarine power cables
HVDC transmission lines
Electric power infrastructure in Sweden
Electric power transmission systems in Germany
Connections across the Baltic Sea
Lübeck
1994 establishments in Germany
1994 establishments in Sweden